A palmier (from French, short for feuille de palmier 'palm tree leaf'), pig's ear, palm heart, or elephant ear is a French pastry in a palm leaf shape or a butterfly shape, sometimes called palm leaves, cœur de France, French hearts, shoe-soles, or  glasses that was invented in the beginning of the 20th century.

Preparation
Palmiers are made from puff pastry, a laminated dough similar to the dough used for croissant, but without yeast. The puff pastry is rolled out, coated with sugar, and then the two sides are rolled up together so that they meet in the middle, making a roll that is then cut into about  slices and baked. Usually it is rolled in sugar before baking.

Varieties
Known as palmeras in Spain, in the Puerto Rican version, they are topped with honey. In Mexico and other Latin American countries they are known as orejas (ears). In Argentina, they are known as palmeritas, derivative from the Spanish denomination. In China, they are known as butterfly pastries. In Greece they are usually known as little glasses (γυαλάκια). In Germany they're called pig's ears (Schweineohren); in Italy Prussiane (derisively after the ostensibly large ears of Prussian invaders); in Switzerland Prussiens or cœur de France. In Catalonia and Valencia they are called ulleres (eyeglasses) or palmeras.  In Spain they are called palmeras (palm trees), and they can be topped with coconut or chocolate. In England, they are called little hearts and sweet hearts. In Scotland "pigs ears" or "pigs lugs". In Pakistan they are called French Hearts. In Japan since 1965, they are called Genji Pie. In India they are known as elephant ears or french hearts.

An arlette is a cinnamon-flavoured palmier biscuit.

See also
 
 List of pastries
 Otap, a similar oval-shaped pastry from the Philippines

References

French pastries
Argentine cuisine
Catalan cuisine
Portuguese desserts
Spanish desserts
Mexican desserts